Gustavo Martínez Frías (May 30, 1935 - August 29, 2009) was the Archbishop of Nueva Pamplona, Colombia.  Martínez Frías was appointed Archbishop of Nueva Pamplona by Pope John Paul II on March 18, 1999 and installed on May 6, 1999.  He remained Archbishop until his death on August 29, 2009, at the age of 74.

Gustavo Martínez Frías was born in Bucaramanga, Colombia, on May 30, 1935.  He was ordained a Catholic priest for the diocese of Socorro y San Gil on November 27, 1960. Martínez Frías served as the bishop of the Roman Catholic Diocese of Ipiales from 1987 until 1999, prior to becoming the Archbishop of Nueva Pamplona.
 
His family was from Province of Santander, San Vicente de Chucuri (his grand father died during La Violencia), his father was don Gustavo Martínez (a blacksmith) and his mother Guillermina Frías (owner of a small store in the main plaza of San Vicente). He was the eldest brother of Alix, Leonor, Hernán, Eduardo and Leonardo (1957–1997) who lived and studied in Paris (1976-1990) and in Rome (1992-1995).

References
Catholic Hierarchy: Archbishop Gustavo Martínez Frías †

1935 births
2009 deaths
21st-century Roman Catholic archbishops in Colombia
20th-century Roman Catholic bishops in Colombia
Roman Catholic archbishops of Nueva Pamplona
Roman Catholic bishops of Ipiales